Acusta ravida is a species of air-breathing land snail in the family Camaenidae native to eastern Asia.

Subspecies
Three subspecies are recognized:
Acusta ravida burtini (Deshayes, 1874)
Acusta ravida frilleyi (Crosse & Debeaux, 1863)
Acusta ravida ravidella (Möllendorff, 1899)

 Acusta ravida lineolata (Möllendorff, 1875): synonym of Acusta lineolata (Möllendorff, 1875) (unaccepted rank)
 Acusta ravida ravidula (Heude, 1882): synonym of Bradybaena ravidula (Heude, 1882) (unaccepted combination and rank)
 Acusta ravida redfieldi (L. Pfeiffer, 1852): synonym of Acusta redfieldi (L. Pfeiffer, 1852) (unaccepted rank)

References

  Sysoev, A. V. & Schileyko, A. A. (2009). Land snails and slugs of Russia and adjacent countries. Sofia/Moskva (Pensoft). 312 pp., 142 plates

External links
 Crosse, H. & Debeaux, O. (1863). Diagnoses d'espèces nouvelles. Journal de Conchyliologie. 11(4): 386-387

Camaenidae